Looping may refer to:

Media and entertainment
 Loop (music), a repeating section of sound material
 Audio induction loop, an aid for the hard of hearing
 a film production term for dubbing (filmmaking)
 repeating drawings in an animated cartoon

Other uses
 Looping (education), the practice of moving groups of children up from one grade to the next with the same teacher
 Loop (computing), a sequence of statements which is specified once but which may be carried out several times in succession
 Looping (yo-yo trick)
 Looping (video game), 1982 arcade game
 a specific type of roller coaster inversion
 an aerobatic maneuver
 a sociology term in a total institution in which an individual's protective response to one assault on the self is made the basis of another
 an ancient worldwide single element textile technique 
 a primitive method of textile construction as used to create a bilum

See also 
 Loop (disambiguation)